Allison Barber, Ph.D., is the president and chief operating officer of the Indiana Fever,  Indiana's WNBA franchise. Previously, she served as the Chancellor of Western Governors University Indiana, president of Sodenta, an adjunct at Georgetown University, and the Deputy Assistant Secretary of Defense for Internal Communications in the United States Department of Defense.

Boards of Directors 
Barber is the Chair of the Board of Trustees for the Sagamore Institute. She was also named by Indiana Governor, Eric Holcomb, to the board of the Indiana Destination Development Corporation. She also serves on the advisory board of the Elizabeth Dole Foundation.  In addition, Allison continues to serve as an American Red Cross volunteer.

Awards 
Barber was named Nonprofit Communicator of the Year by PR News, as well as a "Woman of Influence" by the Indianapolis Business Journal.

Barber was presented the Department of Defense Medal for Distinguished Public Service by Secretary Rumsfeld.

Barber received the Sagamore of the Wabash, presented by Governor Eric Holcomb, who described it as the "highest award in Indiana".

Early life and education
Barber went to Hammond Baptist High School and studied education at Tennessee Temple University. She earned a master of science in education at Indiana University Bloomington and a doctorate of leadership at Tennessee Temple University.

References

External links

 [Fever and Salesforce. [https://www.salesforce.com/blog/indiana-fever-interview

Year of birth missing (living people)
Living people
United States Department of Defense officials
Indiana University Bloomington alumni
Place of birth missing (living people)
Tennessee Temple University alumni
Georgetown University faculty
Western Governors University people